The 1960–61 Purdue Boilermakers men's golf team represented Purdue University. The head coach was Sam Voinoff, then in his twelfth season with the Boilers. The team was a member of the Big Ten Conference. They finished fourth in the Big Ten Conference and went on to win the NCAA national championship.

Roster 
Mark Darnell
Jim Farlander
Jerry Jackson
Joe Kack
Howard Klein
Bill Templin
John Thorington
Steve Wilkinson
Source

Schedule 
Memphis State L, 24-12
Vanderbilt W, 19-17
Tennessee W, 20-7
Louisville W, 26.5-9.5
Ball State W, 25-11
Quad Meet 1st, 912
Northern Illinois W, 24-12
Eastern Illinois W, 31.5-4.5
Quad Meet 3rd, 467
Quad Meet 1st, 917
Notre Dame L, 18.5-17.5
Ball State W, 25-11
Indiana W, 23-13
Indiana Intercollegiate 1st of 4
Big Ten Championships 4th of 10
NCAA Championships 1st of 28

References

Purdue Boilermakers men's golf seasons